Michel Gondry 2: More Videos (Before and After DVD 1) is a DVD compilation of music videos and short films by director Michel Gondry. It was released in April 2009 and includes videos which were not included on Gondry's Directors Label DVD. The compilation includes nearly three hours of videos and never-before-seen behind-the-scenes content

Music videos
Michael Andrews Ft. Gary Jules "Mad World"
Paul McCartney "Dance Tonight"
Thomas Dolby "Close But No Cigar"
Björk "Declare Independence"
Steriogram "Walkie Talkie Man"
The Willowz "I Wonder"
Beck "Cellphone's Dead"
The White Stripes "The Denial Twist"
Donald Fagen "Snowbound"
Cody ChesnuTT "King of the Game"
Sinéad O'Connor "Fire on Babylon"
Queen with Wyclef Jean Ft. Pras & Free "Another One Bites the Dust"
Radiohead "Knives Out"
Dick Annegarn "Soleil Du Soir"
Sananda Maitreya "She Kissed Me"
Sheryl Crow "A Change Would Do You Good"
The Black Crowes "High Head Blues"
Leafbirds "It Can All Be Taken Away"
The Rolling Stones "Gimme Shelter"
Energy Orchard "How the West Was Won"

Behind the scenes footage and other works 
The Simpsons parody of the White Stripes video
Booker T and The Michel Gondrys
Michel Gondry Solves a Rubik's Cube with His Feet
Michel Gondry Solves a Rubik's Cube with His Nose
Jack Black Beats Michel Gondry with His Rubik's Cubes
Herve Di Rosa "Viva Di Rosa"
Conan and the Big Head
Paul Gondry's The Willowz "Take a Look Around"
How to Blow Up a Helicopter (Ayako's Story)
Forum Des Images "L'Histoire De l'Univers"

References

External links 
Michel Gondry's Website
Blogger News Network
DVD Talk
esdMusic

2009 video albums
Music video compilation albums